JAX Tyres & Auto is a tyre retailer in Australia. The company also provides wheels, brakes, suspension and other services for passenger, 4x4 and commercial vehicles. As of 2017, it was the Australia’s largest tyre retailer and was acquired by Hankook Tire.

History
The company was founded in 1949 and opened their first store in Sydney. After the company's initial inception, it did not take long for JAX Tyres & Auto to grow and they opened several franchise stores. JAX Tyres  & Auto was first established to supply only tyres, however from 1986, the company expanded its services from a tyre and wheel focused company to offer brakes and suspension servicing. In 2005, JAX Tyres  & Auto merged with Quick Fit Tyres, which operated in Victoria and Queensland.

As of Jun 2019, JAX Tyres & Auto has 87 franchise stores in Australia.

Services

Retail
JAX Tyres & Auto sells tyres from global manufacturing brands including: BFGoodrich, Bridgestone, Continental, Dunlop, Goodyear, Hankook, Michelin, Pirelli and others.

Automotive
JAX Tyres & Auto also offer automotive maintenance and services related to tyre repairs, wheel alignment & balancing, brakes and suspension, plus oil changes.

Acquisition
In February 2017, Hankook Tire announced that it has acquired JAX Tyres & Auto to reach consumers in the Asia-Pacific region.

See also

List of tire companies

References

External links
 

Privately held companies of Australia
Retail companies established in 1949
Australian companies established in 1949
Automotive companies of Australia